Teresita is an unincorporated community and census-designated place (CDP) in Cherokee County, Oklahoma, United States. The population was 159 at the 2010 census.

Geography
Teresita is located in northern Cherokee County at the junction of the valleys of Spring Creek and Double Spring Creek. Spring Creek is a west-flowing tributary of the Neosho River.

Demographics

References

Census-designated places in Cherokee County, Oklahoma
Census-designated places in Oklahoma